Lieutenant-General Sir Drury Curzon Drury-Lowe  (3 January 1830 – 6 April 1908) was a British Army officer.

Biography
He was born as Drury Curzon Holden on 3 January 1830 at Aston Lodge in Aston-on-Trent when he was called Drury Curzon Holden. His father was William Drury Holden and he changed his name to Lowe when he inherited the Locko Park inheritance.

He was educated privately at his home, Locko Park, near Spondon in Derbyshire, before gaining a baccalaureate at Corpus Christi College, Oxford. He joined the 17th Lancers in 1854 as a Cornet. He was commissioned a Lieutenant in November 1854 and Captain in November 1856.

He served in the Crimean War at the Battle of Chernaya River and was at the Siege of Sevastopol when it fell. He also saw service in the Indian Mutiny in 1858–59. He purchased a commission as Major in 1862, and was promoted to Lieutenant-Colonel of the 17th Lancers in 1866. Sometime between 1862 and 1867, he assumed the surname Drury-Lowe in place of Lowe.

Drury-Lowe commanded the 17th Lancers for 12 years – most notably at the Battle of Ulundi, the last pitched battle of the Anglo-Zulu War. On 5 June 1879, he led the 17th Lancers into battle with Zulu irregulars as part of the Zungeni Mountain skirmish, during which his adjutant, Frederick John Cokayne Frith, was killed and the British had to withdraw. According to Private Miles Gissop, who served in the regiment, Drury-Lowe claimed: "You are all right men. You are all right, they are aiming over your heads" only a moment before a Zulu bullet struck Frith in the heart.

Drury-Lowe was appointed Companion of the Order of the Bath in 1879. In the 1882 Anglo-Egyptian War, he received the surrender of Urabi Pasha. He was publicly thanked in the House of Commons, and knighted on 18 November 1882. He was Inspector of Cavalry at Aldershot from 1885 to 1890. He was promoted to Lieutenant-General in 1890. He became Colonel of the 17th Lancers in 1892.

Last years
Drury-Lowe retired in 1895 and was awarded the Knight Grand Cross of the Order of the Bath, and then resided at Keydell House, Horndean, occasionally writing to The Times. He died on 6 April 1908; his widow died on 17 January 1931.

Notes

View source for Drury Drury-Lowe - Wikipedia

1830 births
1908 deaths
Military personnel from Derbyshire
17th Lancers officers
People from Aston-on-Trent
Alumni of Corpus Christi College, Oxford
British Army lieutenant generals
Knights Grand Cross of the Order of the Bath
British Army personnel of the Crimean War
British military personnel of the Indian Rebellion of 1857
British Army personnel of the Anglo-Zulu War
British Army personnel of the Anglo-Egyptian War
People from Horndean